Spadea is a surname. Notable people with the surname include:

 Bill Spadea (born 1969), American businessman and television host 
 Luanne Spadea (born 1972), American tennis player
 Vince Spadea (born 1974), former professional tennis player

See also
 Spadea, type of periodical

Italian-language surnames